Argopteron is a genus of skippers in the family Hesperiidae.

Species
Recognised species in the genus Argopteron include:
 Argopteron aureipennis (Herrich Schäffer, 1869)

Former species
Argopteron xicca Dyar, 1913 - transferred to Ladda xicca (Dyar, 1913)

References

Natural History Museum Lepidoptera genus database

Heteropterinae
Hesperiidae genera